Sami Kassar (born 2 June 1990) is a Saudi football player who plays for Al-Najma as a left-back.

References

External links 
 

Living people
1990 births
Saudi Arabian footballers
Al-Taawoun FC players
Al-Bukayriyah FC players
Al-Najma SC players
Al-Faisaly FC players
Ohod Club players
Damac FC players
Al-Sahel SC (Saudi Arabia) players
Mudhar Club players
Saudi Professional League players
Saudi First Division League players
Saudi Second Division players
Saudi Third Division players
Saudi Fourth Division players
Association football fullbacks